This article lists events relating to rail transport that occurred during the 1770s.

1771

Births

April births
 April 13 – Richard Trevithick, English inventor and steam locomotive builder (died 1833).

June births
 June 13 – William James, English railway promoter (died 1837).

See also
Years in rail transport